The LA Bowl is an annual NCAA Division I Football Bowl Subdivision (FBS) college football bowl game played at SoFi Stadium in Inglewood, California, first played in December 2021. The bowl has tie-ins with the Mountain West and Pac-12 conferences. The game is branded as the Jimmy Kimmel LA Bowl presented by Stifel, with late-night talk show host Jimmy Kimmel holding the game's naming rights and Stifel as its presenting sponsor.

History 
The Mountain West Conference and Pac-12 Conference announced tie-ins for the new bowl in July 2019, under a five-year agreement. The game was officially unveiled in February 2020. It matches up the Mountain West champion (or the next-highest pick available if the conference champion is selected for the New Year's Six) against the fifth pick from the Pac-12. Previously, the Mountain West champion had received an automatic bid to the Las Vegas Bowl. The game is owned and operated by the owners of SoFi Stadium, StadCo LA, LLC.

Three weeks before the scheduled bowl game debut on December 30, 2020, the game was canceled due to the COVID-19 pandemic.

On June 16, 2021, the game was renamed the Jimmy Kimmel LA Bowl as part of a naming rights agreement with comedian and late-night talk show host Jimmy Kimmel. Announcing the renaming on Jimmy Kimmel Live!, Kimmel remarked that "never before has a bowl game been named after a human being (as far as I know, I didn't check)." The game is the first bowl named for a living figure; other bowls have been named in honor of deceased people:
 The Will Rogers Bowl was held in Oklahoma City in 1947 as a memorial to actor Will Rogers, who died in 1935
 The Grantland Rice Bowl was contested in the NCAA's College Division (1964–1972) and Division II (1973–1977), in honor of sportswriter Grantland Rice, who died in 1954
 The Knute Rockne Bowl was also played in the NCAA's College Division (1969–1972) and Division II (1976–1977), named for coach Knute Rockne, who died in 1931
 The NCAA Division III Football Championship, also known as the Amos Alonzo Stagg Bowl, has been played in the NCAA's Division III since 1973, named for football pioneer and multiple college championship coach Amos Alonzo Stagg, who died in 1965.

The investment bank Stifel was later added as a presenting sponsor.

Game results

MVPs

Appearances by team 
Updated through the December 2022 edition (2 games, 4 total appearances).

Teams with a single appearance
Won: Fresno State, Utah State

Lost: Oregon State, Washington State

Appearances by conference 
Updated through the December 2022 edition (2 games, 4 total appearances).

Game records

Media

Television

Radio

References

External links 
 Official website

Annual sporting events in the United States
College football bowls
American football in Inglewood, California
LA Bowl
Recurring sporting events established in 2021
2021 establishments in California